CIV was an American punk rock band from New York City. The band is named after its vocalist, Anthony Civarelli. Three of the band's members (Civarelli, Siegler and Smilios) were members of Gorilla Biscuits. Siegler also played in other hardcore bands, including Youth of Today and Judge.

After the break-up of Gorilla Biscuits, Civarelli opened a tattoo studio on Long Island. After the band Quicksand had signed to a major label, Schreifels re-united a late version of his former band, wrote a record and produced it, resulting in Set Your Goals. Smilios was replaced by Cache Tolman prior to the recording of their second full-length album, Thirteen Day Getaway. Shortly after releasing Thirteen Day Getaway, CIV disbanded in 2000. They have since reunited for a series of one-off shows, including New York's Black N Blue Bowl in 2008 and Belgium's Groezrock Festival in 2011. CIV had yet another reunion on September 7, 2012 at the Webster Hall in New York City.

Legacy
CIV is known for the single "Can't Wait One Minute More", which was released as a music video which was featured on Beavis and Butt-head and used in a Nissan automobile commercial during the middle of 2005. Lou Koller from hardcore band Sick of It All provided additional vocal tracks for the song. Songs "All Twisted", "Haven't Been Myself in a While", and "Something Special" were also featured on the TV Show What's New, Scooby-Doo?. Their early track "Et Tu Brute?" is featured on the soundtrack to the film Escape From L.A.. Their track "So Far, So Good...So What", was featured on the soundtrack album to the cartoon series Mega Man which is based on the video game series of the same name by Capcom, and it was also played during the end credits of the episode "Brain Bots". "It's Not Your Fault" and "Living Life" can be found in Road Rash 3D.

The San Francisco Bay-area pop punk/hardcore band Set Your Goals is named after CIV's first album of the same name.

Members
 Anthony "CIV" Civarelli - Vocals
 Charlie Garriga - Guitar/Backing Vocals
 Arthur Smilios - Bass/Backing Vocals
 Sammy Siegler - Drums

Discography

See also
List of alternative music artists
Quicksand (band)

References

External links
CIV at Brooklyn Vegan

Hardcore punk groups from New York (state)
Musical groups established in 1994
Musical groups disestablished in 2000
Musical groups reestablished in 2008
Musical groups disestablished in 2008
Musical groups reestablished in 2011
Musical groups disestablished in 2011
Musical groups reestablished in 2012
Musical quartets
Revelation Records artists
1994 establishments in New York City